The Better Woman is a lost 1915 American silent film drama directed by Joseph A. Golden, and starring Lenore Ulric and Lowell Sherman.

Cast
 Lenore Ulric – Kate Tripler
 Edith Thornton – Aline Webster
 Lowell Sherman – Frank Barclay
 Ben Graham – Pop Tripler
 Charles Hutchison – Jim Travers
 Will Browning – Bill Carlin

References

External links
 The Better Woman at IMDb.com
 

1915 films
1915 drama films
1915 lost films
American silent feature films
American black-and-white films
Silent American drama films
Lost American films
Lost drama films
Films directed by Joseph A. Golden
1910s American films